Theodore William King (born October 1, 1965) is an American actor, previously credited as T. W. King, best known for starring as Andy Trudeau on the hit-series Charmed during its first season.

Career
He was first known for playing Danny Roberts on the soap opera Loving (later re-titled The City).

The next year he appeared as the major male leading co-star in the primetime series Charmed as detective Andy Trudeau and the nascent burgeoning, soon-to-be-eight-year franchise around it as the series began its first season run chronicling the adventurous lives of the three Halliwell sister-witches, the "Charmed Ones". King's character Andy, with a background as their childhood friend, is an inspector who helps the sisters cover up complications of supernatural villains and magic's side effects as their new-found witch powers grow and attract evil hoping to absorb their magical abilities. He was the first season's major male love interest of the leading actress, Shannen Doherty (playing Prue Halliwell), from the October 1998 pilot to the May 1999 finale, where his character nobly sacrificed himself in the season finale to save his love and her sisters from an otherwise insoluble magical dilemma.

In 2002, King returned to soaps as Luis Alcazar on General Hospital until his character was killed off. However, he later returned to General Hospital as Luis' identical younger brother, Lorenzo Alcazar.

He has had guest-starring roles on such series as Frasier, Sex and the City and Law & Order: Special Victims Unit, among many others.

His feature film credits include The X-Files movie and a role in the independent feature film “Hoodlum & Son.”

King was born in Hollywood, California, and raised in both Los Angeles and Bethesda, Maryland. He received his college degree from The University of California, Santa Barbara, and went on to study film direction at the Tisch School of the Arts at New York University. He has worked in film editing and been involved in New York Theater over the past several years. King is credited with co-founding the Portal Theater Company, an off-Broadway repertory company, where he directed “Beggars in the House of Plenty,” written by John Patrick Shanley.

Off-screen King is active in various charitable organizations, including The Make-A-Wish Foundation.

In December 2008, King was cast as the mysterious character Downey on the hit series Prison Break, making his first appearance on December 22. The role lasted until the end of the season (May 2009).

In February 2011, King began the role of Tomás, long lost brother of Téa Delgado and romantic interest of Blair Cramer, on One Life to Live remaining until the soap's cancellation in January 2012.

In April 2015, King played the role of Corporal Daniel Collins on the NCIS season 12 episode "Lost in Translation".

Entertainment Weekly exclusively reported on June 21, 2021, that King had been cast on his fifth soap opera The Bold and the Beautiful as Jack Finnegan, John "Finn" Finnegan's (played by Tanner Novlan) father and in what will be the part of the development of Finn's "very dramatic backstory". King's first episodic appearance was on July 30 of that year. He won his first Daytime Emmy Award for Outstanding Guest Performer in a Drama Series for his role as Jack in 2022.

Personal life
In September 2008 King married his girlfriend Maya Rodwell, with whom he became engaged the year before.  The couple welcomed their second child, daughter Ava Celeste, on October 15, 2010.

Filmography

Film

Television

Awards and nominations

References

External links

1965 births
Male actors from California
American male film actors
American male television actors
American male soap opera actors
Daytime Emmy Award winners
Daytime Emmy Award for Outstanding Guest Performer in a Drama Series winners
Living people
People from Bethesda, Maryland
Male actors from Hollywood, Los Angeles
Tisch School of the Arts alumni
University of California, Santa Barbara alumni